BAP Carvajal was the first out of four Carvajal-class frigates ordered by the Peruvian Navy in 1973. It was built by the Italian shipbuilder Cantieri Navali Riuniti at its shipyard in Riva Trigoso, Genoa. Though sea trials were initiated on 9 June 1977 its commissioning was delayed until 23 December 1979 due to delays in equipment deliveries by some subcontractors. In 1998 her flight deck was extended to allow ASH-3D Sea King helicopters to land and refuel, though the hangar is still too small to accommodate them.

Carvajal was named after Vice Admiral Melitón Carvajal (1845–1935) who fought in the War of the Pacific. On 26 December 2013, after being stripped of its missile armament, fire control systems and main radar, the ship was reclassified as Patrullera Oceánica (Offshore patrol vessel) and transferred to the Coast Guard under the name BAP Guardiamarina San Martin (PO-201).

Footnotes

Sources
 Rodríguez, John, "Las fragatas Lupo: una breve mirada retrospectiva y perspectivas". Revista de Marina, Year 95, No. 3: 8-32 (July / December 2002).
 Jane's Fighting Ships 2005-2006

Carvajal-class frigates
1976 ships
Ships built by Fincantieri
Ships built in Italy